Pedro Puente (13 May 1907 – 26 March 1986) was a Peruvian sports shooter. He competed at the 1960 Summer Olympics and the 1964 Summer Olympics.

References

1907 births
1986 deaths
Peruvian male sport shooters
Olympic shooters of Peru
Shooters at the 1960 Summer Olympics
Shooters at the 1964 Summer Olympics
Sportspeople from Lima
Pan American Games medalists in shooting
Pan American Games bronze medalists for Peru
Shooters at the 1951 Pan American Games
Medalists at the 1951 Pan American Games
20th-century Peruvian people